Chris Jackson (born 18 July 1970) is a former association football player who represented New Zealand. He last played for Dapto Dandaloo Fury FC.

Club career
Jackson was born in Napier, and began his senior career with Napier City Rovers, the team he joined while still a student at Napier Boys' High School.  He subsequently moved to Australia to join Melbourne Knights in the National Soccer League in 1992. Jackson joined the Football Kingz when the New Zealand franchise were accepted into the A-League in 1999 captaining the first ever professional game in New Zealand soccer history.

International career
Jackson made his full All Whites debut in the Kings Cup Thailand in January 1990 against North Korea. He was included in the New Zealand side for the 1999 Confederations Cup finals tournament and again when New Zealand qualified for the 2003 Confederations Cup. Jackson ended his international having played 72 times and scored 12 goals for New Zealand, including 60 A-international caps in which he scored 10 times. He captained the All Whites 10 times. His final international appearance was as a substitute in a 0–5 loss to France on 22 June 2003 as New Zealand bowed out of the Confederations Cup in the group stages.

Achievements
New Zealand Player of the Year:1992 and 1995
New Zealand Young Player of the Year: 1988
2010 Illawarra player of the year

References

External links
 Chris Jackson Interview
 This Jackson wants a trial 

1970 births
Living people
Sportspeople from Napier, New Zealand
New Zealand association footballers
New Zealand international footballers
National Soccer League (Australia) players
Football Kingz F.C. players
Melbourne Knights FC players
Waitakere United players
Napier City Rovers FC players
People educated at Napier Boys' High School
Gombak United FC players
Expatriate footballers in Singapore
New Zealand expatriate sportspeople in Singapore
Tampines Rovers FC players
Singapore Premier League players
Association football midfielders
1998 OFC Nations Cup players
1999 FIFA Confederations Cup players
2000 OFC Nations Cup players
2002 OFC Nations Cup players
2003 FIFA Confederations Cup players